The Tudose Cabinet was the 127th Government of Romania. It was led by Mihai Tudose, who assumed office as Prime Minister of Romania on 29 June 2017. The cabinet had 27 mandates, and 16 of the officeholders were also part of the Grindeanu Cabinet, which was previously dismissed by the Parliament a week earlier for inefficiency.

The Tudose cabinet took office on 29 June.

References 

2017 establishments in Romania
Cabinets established in 2017
Cabinets of Romania
Cabinets disestablished in 2018